Andriy Stadnik (born 15 April 1982) is a male wrestler from Ukraine. He won a silver medal in the Men's freestyle 66kg event at the 2008 Summer Olympics in Beijing. Andriy has been married to Mariya Stadnik, a wrestler from Ukraine who represents Azerbaijan. His sister, Yana Rattigan, is also a wrestler.

References

External links
 

1982 births
Living people
Wrestlers at the 2008 Summer Olympics
Olympic wrestlers of Ukraine
Olympic silver medalists for Ukraine
Olympic medalists in wrestling
Medalists at the 2008 Summer Olympics
Ukrainian male sport wrestlers
European Wrestling Championships medalists
20th-century Ukrainian people
21st-century Ukrainian people